The year 1904 in radio involved some significant events.

Events
 7 January (with effect from 1 February) – The Marconi Company establishes "CQD" as one of the first international maritime radio distress signals.
 24 May – The United States Patent Office awards Marconi a patent for a "Wireless signaling system".
 16 November – English electrical engineer John Ambrose Fleming, working for Marconi, is awarded a United States patent for the Fleming valve, the first thermionic vacuum tube, a two-electrode diode, which he calls the oscillation valve.
 First radio transmission of music, at Graz, Austria.

Births
 5 January – Anona Winn, Australian-born British broadcasting personality (d. 1994)
 15 January – Charles Hill, British physician, medical and broadcast executive, politician and "The Radio Doctor" (d. 1989)
 23 February – William L. Shirer, American war correspondent (d. 1993)
 8 May – John Snagge, English radio newsreader (d. 1996)
 24 May – Sefton Delmer, German-born British propaganda radio broadcaster (d. 1979)
 14 August – Lindley Fraser, Scottish-born academic economist and broadcaster (d. 1963)
 24 November – Pegeen Fitzgerald, American radio talk-show host (both alone and with her husband, Ed) on WOR and WJZ in New York City and Norcatur, Kansas (d. 1989)

References

 
Radio by year